Thomas P. Tiffany (born December 30, 1957) is an American businessman and politician serving as the U.S. representative for Wisconsin's 7th congressional district since 2020. A member of the Republican Party, he was elected to the Wisconsin State Assembly in 2011 and the Wisconsin Senate in 2013. Tiffany succeeded Sean Duffy in Congress, winning a special election against Democrat Tricia Zunker.

Early life and education
Tiffany was born in Wabasha, Minnesota, and grew up on a dairy farm near Elmwood, Pierce County, Wisconsin, with five brothers and two sisters. He graduated from Elmwood High School in 1976 and earned his B.S. in agricultural economics from the University of Wisconsin–River Falls in 1980.

Private career
Tiffany managed the petroleum division of a farm cooperative in Plainview, Minnesota, before moving to Minocqua, Wisconsin, to manage Zenker Oil Company's petroleum distribution in 1988. He and his wife, Chris, have operated an excursion business on the Willow Flowage since 1991.

Tiffany served as the Town Supervisor of Little Rice, Wisconsin, from 2009 to 2013, and is an appointed member of the Oneida County Economic Development Corporation. In 2004 and 2008, he ran to represent the 12th district in the Wisconsin State Senate, first against Senator Roger Breske, and then Jim Holperin, losing both times in close elections. In 2010, he ran for the Wisconsin State Assembly after incumbent Donald Friske retired. Tiffany won the primary and defeated Democratic nominee Jay Schmelling, 58.09% to 41.81%.

In 2012, Tiffany chose not to seek reelection to the Assembly and instead to run again for the Senate after Holperin announced he would not run for reelection. He defeated Democrat Susan Sommer, 56% to 40%, in the general election.

U.S. House of Representatives

Elections

2020 special 

Incumbent Representative Sean Duffy resigned on September 23, 2019, after his youngest daughter was diagnosed with a heart condition. Tiffany announced that he would run in a special election to succeed him. He won the February 18 Republican primary and defeated Wausau attorney Tricia Zunker in the May 12 special election.

2020

Tiffany defeated Zunker in a rematch in the November 3 general election with 60.7% of the vote.

Tenure 
Tiffany was sworn in on May 19, 2020.

In December 2020, Tiffany was one of 126 Republican members of the House of Representatives to sign an amicus brief in support of Texas v. Pennsylvania, a lawsuit filed at the United States Supreme Court contesting the results of the 2020 presidential election, in which Joe Biden defeated incumbent Donald Trump. The Supreme Court declined to hear the case on the basis that Texas lacked standing under Article III of the Constitution to challenge the results of an election held by another state.

Tiffany was among the 120 House members, all Republicans, who objected to counting Arizona's and Pennsylvania's electoral votes in the 2020 presidential election. Representative Scott L. Fitzgerald joined Tiffany in this objection.

In June 2021, Tiffany was one of 14 House Republicans to vote against legislation to establish June 19, or Juneteenth, as a federal holiday.

Iraq
In June 2021, Tiffany was one of 49 House Republicans to vote to repeal the AUMF against Iraq.

Syria
In 2023, Tiffany was among 47 Republicans to vote in favor of H.Con.Res. 21, which directed President Joe Biden to remove U.S. troops from Syria within 180 days.

Committee assignments 

 Committee on the Judiciary
 Committee on Natural Resources

Caucus memberships 
 Republican Study Committee
Congressional Dairy Farmer Caucus
Congressional Sportsmen's Caucus
Congressional Taiwan Caucus
Freedom Caucus

Personal life
Tiffany and his wife, Christine, have three children.

Tiffany is Protestant.

Electoral history

Wisconsin Senate (2004, 2008)

| colspan="6" style="text-align:center;background-color: #e9e9e9;"| Republican Primary Election, September 14, 2004

| colspan="6" style="text-align:center;background-color: #e9e9e9;"| General Election, November 2, 2004

| colspan="6" style="text-align:center;background-color: #e9e9e9;"| General Election, November 4, 2008

Wisconsin Assembly (2010)

| colspan="6" style="text-align:center;background-color: #e9e9e9;"| Republican Primary Election, September 14, 2010

| colspan="6" style="text-align:center;background-color: #e9e9e9;"| General Election, November 2, 2010

Wisconsin Senate (2012, 2016)

| colspan="6" style="text-align:center;background-color: #e9e9e9;"| General Election, November 6, 2012

U.S. House of Representatives (2020)

| colspan="6" style="text-align:center;background-color: #e9e9e9;"| Republican Primary Election, February 18, 2020

| colspan="6" style="text-align:center;background-color: #e9e9e9;"| Special Election, May 12, 2020

U.S. House of Representatives (2022)

References

External links

 Congressman Tom Tiffany official U.S. House website
 Tom Tiffany for Congress
 Tom Tiffany at Wisconsin Legislature 
 
 
 

|-

|-

|-

1957 births
21st-century American politicians
American Protestants
Businesspeople from Wisconsin
Christians from Wisconsin
Living people
Democratic Party members of the Wisconsin State Assembly
Protestants from Wisconsin
People from Minocqua, Wisconsin
People from Pierce County, Wisconsin
People from Wabasha, Minnesota
Republican Party members of the United States House of Representatives from Wisconsin
University of Wisconsin–River Falls alumni
Wisconsin city council members
Democratic Party Wisconsin state senators